The greater lophorina (Lophorina superba), also known as superb bird-of-paradise or greater superb bird-of-paradise, is a species of the Paradisaeidae (bird-of-paradise) family. It was considered the sole species in the genus until in 2017 it was recognised that there were three species (L. superba, Lophorina minor, and Lophorina niedda).

Description
It is a small, approximately 26 cm long, (passerine) bird. The male is black with an iridescent green crown, blue-green breast cover and a long velvety black erectile cape covering his back. The female is a reddish-brown bird with brownish barred buff below. The young is similar to the female. The greater lophorina is a dimorphic species.

Courtship display
The species has an unusually low population of females, and competition among males for mates is intensely fierce. This has led the species to have one of the most elaborate courtship displays in the avian world. There are two main stages of courtship display. The first display, known as the initial display activity involves a series of relatively simple behaviours. The initial display is then followed by a more elaborate courtship show, known as the high intensity display.  After carefully and meticulously preparing a "dance floor" (even scrubbing the dirt or branch smooth with leaves), the male first attracts a female with a loud call. After the curious female approaches, his folded black feather cape and blue-green chest feathers shield spring upward and spread widely and symmetrically around his head, instantly transforming the frontal view of the male bird into a spectacular ellipse-shaped creature that rhythmically snaps his tail feathers against each other, similar to how snapping fingers work, while hopping in frantic circles around the female. The average female rejects 15-20 potential suitors before consenting to mate. The show that males put on to attract females can be a long process that takes up many hours in a day. These species are polygynous and usually will mate with more than one female.

Distribution and habitat
The greater lophorina is distributed throughout rain forests of New Guinea. It inhabits most commonly in rain forests or forest edges of Indonesia and Papua New Guinea. They can also be found inhabiting mountainous habitats of the forests in New Guinea.

The greater lophorina is also usually found on top of the trees that reside in the rain forests.

Feeding habits
The greater lophorina travels across the trees in the forest to catch its prey which can vary depending on seasonal availability of food. The greater lophorina has not only been known to eat fruits and insects, but also have been spotted preying on larger animals such as frogs, reptiles, and other small birds. They can sometimes be seen foraging food on the grounds of the forest for insects. Male Superba are considered to be territorial as they defend land as small as 1.2 ha. Within that land, they forage for fruits and insects.

Predators
Known predators of the superb bird-of-paradise include birds of prey and snakes.

Reproduction and chick behavior
The greater lophorina forms their nest on top of trees using soft material that they find around the forest such as leaves. When reproducing, they usually produce from 1-3 eggs within a nest. It takes about 16–22 days for the eggs to hatch and for the chicks to be born. After that, chicks will be able to live on their own within 16–30 days, leaving their nest and becoming independent. Male superb birds-of-paradise tend to take about two years longer for them to mature compared to the females. Also, it will take about 4–7 years for males to develop their feathers for their courtship displays.

Status
Although heavily hunted for its plumes, the greater lophorina is one of the most common and widespread birds of paradise in the forests of New Guinea, and is evaluated as Least Concern on the IUCN Red List of Threatened Species. It is listed on Appendix II of CITES.

Subspecies
 Lophorina superba connectens- considered a synonym of L. s. latipennis.
 Lophorina superba feminina
 Lophorina superba latipennis
 Lophorina superba pseudoparotia- now found to be a hybrid between present species and Parotia carolae.
 Lophorina superba superba

The crescent-caped lophorina was considered to be a subspecies (L. s. niedda) until 2017, as was lesser lophorina (L. s. minor), though minor is sometimes disputed as a full species. This 2017 reclassification is disputed, however; the subspecies L. niedda inopinata comprises the taxon that was known as L. superba superba until 2017, but given a new name, and the subspecies known as L. superba feminina until 2017 was renamed as L. superba superba, while other taxonomists argue that regardless of the evidence, names should not be reassigned from one recognized taxon to another after over 200 years of consistent application.

Gallery

References

Further reading

External links

 Superb Bird-of-Paradise Video by the Cornell Lab of Ornithology
 BirdLife Species Factsheet
 

greater lophorina
Birds of New Guinea
greater lophorina
greater lophorina